Scellus is a genus of flies in the family Dolichopodidae.

Species

Scellus abditus Hurley, 1995
Scellus alactaga Stackelberg, 1951
Scellus amplus Curran, 1923
Scellus asaroticus Hurley, 1995
Scellus avidus Loew, 1864
Scellus bianchii Stackelberg, 1951
Scellus coloradensis Harmston & Knowlton, 1942
Scellus crinipes Van Duzee, 1925
Scellus dolichocerus Gerstaecker, 1864
Scellus dyscritus Hurley, 1995
Scellus exustus (Walker, 1852)
Scellus filifer Loew, 1864
Scellus gallicanus Becker, 1909
Scellus grichanovi Naglis, 2012
Scellus hissaricus Stackelberg, 1951
Scellus knowltoni Harmston, 1939
Scellus monstrosus Osten Sacken, 1877
Scellus notatus (Fabricius, 1781)
Scellus obuchovae (Stackelberg, 1951)
Scellus paramonovi Stackelberg, 1926
Scellus sinensis Yang, 1998
Scellus spinimanus (Zetterstedt, 1843)
Scellus tshernovskii Stackelberg, 1951
Scellus varipennis Van Duzee, 1925
Scellus vigil Osten Sacken, 1877
Scellus virago Aldrich, 1907

References

Dolichopodidae genera
Hydrophorinae
Diptera of Europe
Diptera of North America
Taxa named by Hermann Loew